Margaret Millar may refer to:

Margaret Millar, American-Canadian writer (1915-1994)
Maggie Millar, Australian actress (born 1941)

See also
Margaret Miller (disambiguation)
Millar (disambiguation)